The Northern Ireland Office (NIO; , Ulster-Scots: Norlin Airlann Oaffis) is a department of His Majesty's Government responsible for Northern Ireland affairs. The NIO is led by the Secretary of State for Northern Ireland and is based at Erskine House in Belfast City Centre and 1 Horse Guards Road in London.

Role
The NIO's role is to "maintain and support" the devolution settlement resulting from the Good Friday Agreement and St Andrews Agreement and the devolution of criminal justice and policing to the Northern Ireland Assembly.
The department has responsibility for:
 electoral law
 human rights and equality
 national security in Northern Ireland
 the UK Government's approach to the legacy of the Troubles

It also represents Northern Irish interests at UK Government level and the interests of the UK Government in Northern Ireland.

The Northern Ireland Office has a close working relationship with the Government of Ireland as a co-guarantor of the peace process; this includes the British-Irish Intergovernmental Conference and its joint secretariat.

In the Irish Government, the NIO's main counterparts are:
 the Department of Foreign Affairs (on the peace process);
 the Department of the Taoiseach (supporting the role of the Taoiseach in the peace process);
 the Department of Justice (on national security matters and the legacy of the Troubles);
 the Department of Housing, Local Government and Heritage (on electoral law).

History
After partition in 1924 the Dublin Castle administration was largely replaced by the Parliament of Northern Ireland with the Northern Ireland Department of the Home Office handling the oversight from London, with some extremely important decisions such as sending of British Army soldiers to Northern Ireland in 1969 being made by the Home Secretary.  In March 1972 with the Troubles worsening and the UK Government losing confidence in the Northern Ireland Government, direct rule from Westminster was introduced.

The formation of the NIO put Northern Ireland on the same level as Scotland and Wales, where the Scottish Office and Welsh Office were established in 1885 and 1965 respectively.  The NIO assumed policing and justice powers from the Ministry of Home Affairs.  NIO junior ministers were placed in charge of other Northern Ireland Civil Service departments.

Direct rule was seen as a temporary measure, with a power-sharing devolution preferred as the solution.  Under the Northern Ireland (Temporary Provisions) Act 1972, the Secretary of State for Northern Ireland replaced the Governor of Northern Ireland and direct rule was annually renewed by a vote in Parliament.

The Sunningdale Agreement in 1973 resulted in a brief, power-sharing Northern Ireland Executive, which was ended by the Ulster Workers' Council strike on 28 May 1974.  The Northern Ireland Constitutional Convention (1975–1976) and Northern Ireland Assembly (1982–1986) were unsuccessful in restoring devolved government.  After the Anglo-Irish Agreement on 15 November 1985, the UK Government and Irish Government co-operated more closely on security and political matters.

Following the Good Friday Agreement on 10 April 1998, devolution returned to Northern Ireland on 2 December 1999.  The Northern Ireland Executive was suspended on 15 October 2002 and direct rule returned until devolution was restored on 8 May 2007.

The devolution of policing and justice powers on 12 April 2010 transferred many of the NIO's previous responsibilities to the Northern Ireland Assembly and its devolved government, the Northern Ireland Executive.  The Department of Justice is now responsible for those matters. This transfer of power resulted in a smaller Northern Ireland Office, comparable to the Scotland Office and Wales Office.

Current ministers
The NIO ministers are as follows:

As Attorney General for England and Wales, The Rt Hon. Michael Ellis QC MP is Advocate General for Northern Ireland, advising the UK Government on Northern Ireland law.

Secretaries of State for Northern Ireland 

The department is led by the Secretary of State for Northern Ireland.

Ministers of State for Northern Ireland

Parliamentary Under-Secretaries of State for Northern Ireland

Permanent Secretary 
The senior civil servant in the NIO is Madeleine Alessandri, who replaced Sir Jonathan Stephens in February 2020. She was formerly the Prime Minister's Adviser on National Resilience and Security.

See also
 Northern Ireland Affairs Committee
 Northern Ireland Assembly
 Northern Ireland Executive
 Department of Justice

References

External links
 Northern Ireland Office

 
1972 establishments in the United Kingdom
Government agencies established in 1972
Ministerial departments of the Government of the United Kingdom
Government of Northern Ireland